Parnassius loxias  is a high-altitude butterfly which is found in Kirghizia and west China. It is a member of the snow Apollo genus (Parnassius) of the swallowtail family (Papilionidae).

References
Weiss, J.-C. 1992. The Parnassiinae of the World. Part 2. Sciences Nat, Venette; 87 pp.

Further reading
sv:Parnassius loxias - Swedish Wikipedia provides further references and synonymy

External links
Parnassius of the World Text and photos
Funet Taxonomy, distribution

loxias
Butterflies described in 1901
Butterflies of Asia
Insects of Central Asia